Nancy Lee Andrews (born May 14, 1947) is a former international model turned photographer who is based in Nashville.  She published a collection of her photography, A Dose of Rock 'n' Roll, in 2008.

Early life 
Andrews was born on May 14, 1947 in Jersey City, New Jersey.  When Andrews turned seventeen, she literally bumped into television legend Arthur Godfrey on a busy Manhattan street.  She shared her bad day with the radio icon and a quick friendship blossomed.  He arranged for Andrews a meeting with Ford Models.  It turned out to be his last day in Manhattan and he wanted to leave the city by doing a good deed.

Andrews worked as a Ford model in the 1960s and 1970s, with photographers Richard Avedon, Dick Ballerian, Irving Penn, Hiro, Bert Stern, Gordon Munro, and Milton Greene.

Rock photographer 
Encouraged by former Beatle Ringo Starr, Andrews began shooting fashion assignments for designer boutiques along Rodeo Drive and trendy Melrose Avenue.  She moved quickly into the music business, photographing many rock performers, as well as shooting publicity and photo packages for two of Starr's albums: Ringo the 4th and Bad Boy.

Nashville 
Andrews moved to Nashville, Tennessee in 1994 and opened her photography studio in Cummins Station the following year.  In 1996 she was appointed director of photography for Twang, a Vanity Fair take on country music.

In addition to CD packages and promotional photography for major labels, her work has appeared in, and on the covers of, McCall's, USA Today, JAZZIZ, Penthouse, Black Enterprise, Music Row, People, and several other music publications. She also shoots for many advertising agencies.

Personal 
Andrews is married to Edwin Barnes (1990). She was in a relationship with Ringo Starr (who she met through John Lennon) from 1974 to 1980, and they were engaged. After they broke up, she sued him for palimony. She has two younger sisters and two dogs.

References

General references 
 Andrews, Nancy Lee (2008).  A Dose of Rock 'n' Roll.  Dalton Watson Fine Books.  
 New York magazine Jan 10, 1983, "The Prince of Palimony"

1947 births
Living people
Artists from Jersey City, New Jersey
People from Nashville, Tennessee
Female models from New Jersey
American women photographers
21st-century American women